Caulophyllum thalictroides, the blue cohosh, a species of Caulophyllum (family Berberidaceae) is a flowering plant in the Berberidaceae (barberry) family. It is a medium-tall perennial with blue berry-like fruits and bluish-green foliage. The common name cohosh is probably from an Algonquian word meaning "rough". The Greek-derived genus name Caulophyllum signifies "stem-leaf", while the specific name thalictroides references the similarity between the large highly divided, multiple-compound leaves of meadow-rues (Thalictrum spp.) and those of blue cohosh.

Description
From the single stalk rising from the ground, there springs a single, large, three-branched leaf, giving rise to a yellow-flowered inflorescence, followed by bluish berries, coated with a glaucous, waxy bloom, somewhat similar in appearance to sloes. The bluish-green leaflets are three-lobed and entire at the base, but serrate at the tip.

Habitat and Distribution
The plant is found in hardwood forests and favors moist coves and hillsides, generally in shady locations, in rich soil. It grows in eastern North America, from Manitoba and Oklahoma east to the Atlantic Ocean.

Pollination
The plant is pollinated early in the season by certain bee species, which are attracted by the nectar glands present on the petals .

Uses
The plant has been used as a medicinal herb by American Indians. Many Native American tribes, and later European herbologists and mid-wives, would use this herb in conjunction with other herbs and fluids for abortive and contraceptive purposes.

The seeds have also reportedly been used a coffee substitute.

Gallery

See also
Black cohosh (Actaea racemosa), although similarly named, is actually a plant in a separate genus.

References

External links

Flora of Eastern Canada
Flora of the Northeastern United States
Flora of the North-Central United States
Flora of the Southeastern United States
Flora of Ontario
Plants used in traditional Native American medicine
Abortifacients
Berberidaceae
Flora without expected TNC conservation status